Elaphriella helios is a species of sea snail, a marine gastropod mollusk, in the family Solariellidae. The species has a shell about 8.9mm in size.

Distribution
This species occurs in Philippines.

References

Solariellidae